Richard L. Myers (b. Massillon, Ohio, 1937) is an American experimental filmmaker based in northeast Ohio. He holds a Bachelor of Fine Arts degree (1959) and a Master of Arts degree (1961), both from Kent State University in Kent, Ohio.

Myers taught at Kent State University in the art department beginning in 1964 and is particularly known for his 1970 film Confrontation at Kent State, which he filmed in Kent during the week following the Kent State shootings of May 4, 1970; it is an important document of the period.

Myers began to produce independent films in the early 1960s.  Many of his films are highly personal, with non-narrative or loose narrative structures derived from his dreams.  Although some films (as, for example, his 1993 film Tarp) feature no actors at all, instead focusing entirely on inanimate objects, most films feature nonprofessional actors and are produced on very small budgets.

Myers is the recipient of two (due to a name spelling error) Guggenheim Fellowships as well as grants from the American Film Institute and the National Endowment for the Arts.

The Academy Film Archive preserved several of Richard Myers' films, including Akran, The Path, and Allison Beth Krause.

Now retired from Kent State University, Myers lives with his wife in Munroe Falls, Ohio.

Selected list of films
1960 – The Path
1964 – First Time Here
1965 – Coronation
1966 – Hiram-Upward Bound
1969 – Akran
1970 – Akbar
1970 – Bill and Ruby
1970 – Confrontation at Kent State
1971 – Allison
1971 – Deathstyles
1972 – Zocalo
1973 – Da
1974 – 37–73
1978 – Floorshow
1984 – Jungle Girl
1990 – Moving Pictures
1993 – Tarp
1996 – Monstershow
2003 – Marjory's Diary

References

External links

Richard Myers page from Canyon Cinema site

People from Kent, Ohio
Kent State University alumni
Kent State University faculty
1937 births
Living people
Film directors from Ohio